North Houston may refer to:

 Communities in the northern areas of Houston, Texas, United States
 North Houston, Texas United States

See also
 Houston (disambiguation)